The table tennis tournaments at the 2024 Summer Olympics in Paris are scheduled to run from 27 July to 10 August at the Paris Expo Porte de Versailles. A total of 172 table tennis players, with an equal distribution between men and women, will compete across five medal events (two per gender and a mixed) at these Games, the exact same amount as those in the previous editions. After a hugely successful Tokyo 2020, the mixed doubles tournament remains in the table tennis program for the second time at the Olympics.

Qualification

172 table tennis quota places, with an equal split between men and women, are available for Paris 2024; NOCs can enter a maximum of six table tennis players across five medal events (men's and women's singles; men's and women's teams, and mixed doubles) with a maximum of two each for the men's and women's singles. The host nation France reserves a direct spot each in the men's and women's teams, respectively, with one per gender competing in the singles tournament; and in the mixed doubles (previously inaugurated in Tokyo 2020).

Competition schedule

Medal summary

Medal table

Medalists

See also
Table tennis at the 2022 Asian Games
Table tennis at the 2023 European Games
Table tennis at the 2023 Pan American Games

References

External links
  – ITTF

 
Table tennis competitions in France
2024
2024 Summer Olympics events
Olympics